

Headline Events of the Year
First radio broadcast of the World Series.
Babe Ruth breaks Roger Connor's All-Time Home Run record of 138.

Champions
World Series: New York Giants over New York Yankees (5–3)

Awards and honors
League Award
 None

MLB statistical leaders

Major league baseball final standings

American League final standings

National League final standings

Negro leagues final standings

Negro National League final standings
This was the second overall season of the first Negro National League. Chicago repeated as pennant champion.

East (independent teams) final standings
A loose confederation of teams were gathered in the East to compete with the West, however East teams did not organize a formal league as the West did.

Playoffs
Chicago, the best team of the "West" and Hilldale, the best team of the "East Coast", engaged in a "postseason series" that was played over eleven days in three states (Pennsylvania, Delaware, New Jersey). It was the first postseason series between two Negro league teams in eight years and it would be the first of six held in the 1920s. Hilldale won three games to Chicago winning two while Game 4 ended in tie.

Events

January
January 23- The Chicago Cubs release First Baseman Fred Merkle. 
January 25- The Chicago Cubs released infielder Buck Herzog. Herzog never again played in the major leagues.

February

March
March 12 –  Baseball commissioner Kenesaw Mountain Landis suspends eight members of the Chicago White Sox club for their alleged involvement in the fixing of the 1919 World Series. The group includes outfielder Shoeless Joe Jackson, who batted .375 in the Series. Others players banned are Eddie Cicotte, Happy Felsch, Chick Gandil, Fred McMullin, Swede Risberg, Buck Weaver and Lefty Williams. None of them will ever play in organized baseball again.

April
April 13 : 
George Toporcer debuts at second base for the St. Louis Cardinals. Nicknamed "Specs", he is the first position player to wear eyeglasses on the field.
In the season opener, New York Yankees left fielder Babe Ruth goes five-for-five with two doubles, two runs batted in and a run scored to lead the Yankees to an 11–1 victory over the Philadelphia Athletics at the Polo Grounds.
April 24 – Shortstop Ralph Miller hits a single and draws a walk, and is the only base runner as the Philadelphia Phillies are one-hit by Phil Douglas and the New York Giants.

May
May 15- Goose Goslin makes his MLB debut for the Washington Senators, going 1 for 3. Goslin would go one to become one of the few star players for the franchise and eventually be inducted into the baseball hall of fame. 
May 22 – In their first meeting of the season, the Pittsburgh Pirates defeat the New York Giants 8–6 at the Polo Grounds, to improve their record to 25–6 and to increase their lead over the second place Giants to 4.5 games. After trailing for most of the game, the Pirates scored twice in the eighth and six times in the ninth.
May 30 – There are eight doubleheaders on the major league schedule, with all four NL contests resulting in a sweep; the Pittsburgh Pirates sweep the Chicago Cubs at Forbes Field, the New York Giants sweep the Philadelphia Phillies at the Polo Grounds, the St. Louis Cardinals sweep the Cincinnati Reds at Redland Field and the Boston Braves sweep the Brooklyn Dodgers at Braves Field. Meanwhile, in the American League, the Boston Red Sox are swept by the A's in Philadelphia, and the St. Louis Browns and Chicago White Sox split a pair at Comiskey Park, the Cleveland Indians and Detroit Tigers split a pair at Navin Field, and the New York Yankees and Washington Senators split a pair at Griffith Stadium. Highlights of the doubleheaders include a two-hitter by the Senators' George Mogridge, and a sixteen inning marathon between the Braves and Dodgers.

June
June 13 - Babe Ruth pitches the first five innings and hit two home runs in an 11–8 victory over The Detroit Tigers.

July
July 8 - Tigers right fielder Harry Heilmann hits a 610-foot home run 
July 12 – Babe Ruth hits his 33rd and 34th home run of the season. His 33rd home run gave him 136 career home runs, tying Roger Connor's all-time mark. His 34th home run makes him the all-time home run king, a title he will hold until .

August
August 9 – The St. Louis Browns defeat the Washington Senators 8–6 in nineteen innings. Dixie Davis pitches all nineteen innings for St. Louis.
August 12 – Philadelphia Phillies pitcher George Smith gives up twelve hits and still hurling a shutout as the Phillies beat the Boston Braves 4–0.
August 19 – Ty Cobb of the Detroit Tigers becomes the fourth player with 3000 career hits.
August 27 – With a 3–1 victory at the Polo Grounds, the New York Giants complete a five-game sweep of the visiting Pittsburgh Pirates to move within 2.5 games of first place Pittsburgh. The Giants out scored the Pirates 27–6 in the series.

September
September 9 – The Detroit Tigers and Chicago White Sox lock up in a slugfest at Comiskey Park. The Tigers collect twenty hits and six walks on their way to scoring fifteen runs. However, the White Sox score twenty runs on 22 hits, including a home run by Earl Sheely.
September 16
In the first game of a crucial three-game series for first place in the National League, the New York Giants' Fred Toney holds the Pittsburgh Pirates to two hits in the Giants' 5–0 victory.
Hall of Famer Goose Goslin makes his major league debut in the Washington Senators' 2–0 loss to the Cleveland Indians.
September 17 – The New York Giants complete a ten-game winning streak that sees them go from a half game back of the Pittsburgh Pirates in the National League to first place, 4.5 games up.
September 20 – With a 4–2 victory over the Detroit Tigers, and a 7–4 loss by the Cleveland Indians at the hands of the Boston Red Sox, the New York Yankees capture first place in the American League, and hold it for the remainder of the season.
September 25 – The New York Yankees defeat the Cleveland Indians 21–7. Surprisingly, none of the 21 runs scored are driven in by Babe Ruth, who goes on to compile one of the greatest single seasons of batting in Major League baseball history by hitting 59 home runs, driving in 171 runs, scoring 177 runs with 204 hits for a .378 batting average in only 540 At-Bats. His On-base percentage for the season is .510 and his slugging percentage is an astounding .846 mark. Ruth's 59 home runs are more than the other seven American League team home run totals combined.
September 29 – Future Hall of Fame outfielder Kiki Cuyler makes his major league debut with the Pittsburgh Pirates. He is held hitless in three at-bats by St. Louis Cardinals pitcher Bill Sherdel.

October
October 2 – The Philadelphia Athletics lose 11–6 to the Washington Senators for their 100th loss of the season, giving both Philadelphia teams 100 losses for the season.
October 5 – The New York Yankees defeat the New York Giants 3–0 in the first World Series game in franchise history. The Series is the first to be broadcast on radio. Announcer Thomas Cowan recreated the game over Westinghouse-owned WJZ in Newark, listening to phoned-in reports from the stadium.
October 6 – The Yankees defeat the Giants in the second game of the World Series by the same score of the first game, 3–0.
October 7 – After having been outscored 10–0 in the World season, and falling behind 4–0 to the Yankees in game three, the Giants explode for thirteen runs, and defeat the Yankees 13–5.
October 9 – The New York Giants even the 1921 World Series at two games apiece with a 4–2 victory. Babe Ruth homers in the bottom of the ninth.
October 10 – Babe Ruth catches the New York Giants' infield off guard as the Yankee slugger bunts his way on to lead off the fourth inning. The strategy works, as Ruth scores the winning run in the Yankees' 3–1 victory.
October 11 – The New York Giants battle back from 3–0 and 5–3 deficits to beat the Yankees 8–5 in game six of the World Series.
October 12 – A costly error by second baseman Aaron Ward on a Johnny Rawlings ground ball leads to an unearned run, and is the difference in the Giants' 2–1 victory in game seven of the World Series.
October 13 – The New York Giants defeat the New York Yankees, 1–0, in Game eight of the World Series to capture their second World Championship, five games to three. For the first time in World Series play, all games were held at one site: the Polo Grounds in New York, with the home team alternating. The Yankees sub-leased the Polo Grounds from the New York Giants from  through .

November

December

Births

January
January 1 – Royce Lint
January 1 – Doris Tetzlaff
January 3 – Lucella MacLean
January 7 – Ted Beard
January 8 – Herb Conyers
January 8 – Marv Rickert
January 8 – Johnny Tobin
January 11 – Al Kvasnak
January 19 – Mary Louise Lester
January 21 – Ken Polivka
January 28 – Julio Moreno

February
February 1 – Dave Madison
February 3 – Red Durrett
February 8 – Hoot Evers
February 8 – Willard Marshall
February 12 – Don Bollweg
February 13 – Pete Castiglione
February 17 – Muriel Coben
February 17 – Doyle Lade
February 20 – Jack Robinson
February 25 – Andy Pafko

March
March 1 – Howie Fox
March 1 – Art Frantz
March 1 – Frank Rosso
March 2 – Dick Starr
March 3 – Roy Nichols
March 5 – Elmer Valo
March 7 – Les Fusselman
March 10 – James Atkins
March 10 – Johnny Blatnik
March 10 – George Elder
March 13 – Joe Rossi
March 14 – Bill Kennedy
March 20 – Bill Peterman
March 22 – George Crowe
March 29 – Ferris Fain
March 30 – Dick Fowler

April
April 1 – Red Murff
April 3 – Dick Conger
April 5 – Bobby Hogue
April 7 – Frank Seward
April 8 – Dee Sanders
April 9 – Charlie Mead
April 10 – Chuck Connors
April 11 – Jim Hearn
April 21 – Vivian Anderson
April 21 – Bob Rinker
April 23 – Warren Spahn
April 26 – Gene Lambert
April 27 – Mary Reynolds

May
May 4 – Larry Drake
May 6 – Bob Chesnes
May 6 – Dick Wakefield
May 18 – John Fick
May 19 – John Carden
May 20 – Hal Newhouser
May 20 – Earl Rapp
May 23 – Bill Drescher
May 24 – Clancy Smyres

June
June 7 – Bill McCahan
June 9 – Ray Shore
June 10 – Al Verdel
June 13 – Nancy Warren
June 17 – Dave Pope
June 19 – Clara Cook
June 23 – Ed Redys
June 26 – Howie Pollet
June 27 – Hank Behrman
June 27 – Lou Kretlow
June 28 – Steve Filipowicz
June 30 – Jack Albright
June 30 – Joe Stephenson

July
July 5 – Al Kozar
July 5 – Guillermo Vento
July 7 – Johnny Van Cuyk
July 11 – Hal Gregg
July 13 – Harry Dorish
July 17 – Tex Hoyle
July 22 – Al LaMacchia
July 22 – Jim Rivera
July 24 – Clint Conatser
July 25 – Marv Rackley
July 25 – Sandy Ullrich
July 26 – Tom Saffell
July 28 – Ben Steiner
July 29 – Jim LaMarque

August
August 1 – Ray Hamrick
August 3 – Joe Lafata
August 5 – Anita Foss
August 5 – Ebba St. Claire
August 12 – Lefty Wallace
August 18 – Alice DeCambra
August 21 – Lou Knerr
August 23 – Dale Mitchell
August 25 – Al Jurisich
August 27 – Nick Picciuto
August 28 – Cliff Aberson
August 28 – Bill Bradford
August 31 – Chub Feeney

September
September 1 – Joe Erautt
September 2 – Josephine Lenard
September 5 – Vince Shupe
September 6 – Jack Phillips
September 19 – Clara Chiano
September 21 – John McHale
September 24 – Charlene Pryer
September 24 – Clyde Vollmer
September 26 – John H. Johnson
September 26 – Clarence Maddern
September 30 – Eddie McGah

October
October 2 – Ralph Weigel
October 7 – Red Adams
October 7 – Charlie Fox
October 7 – Hank Presswood
October 7 – Al Sima
October 10 – Hank Riebe
October 16 – Matt Batts
October 17 – Ken Brondell
October 30 – Ted Abernathy
October 30 – Chet Kehn

November
November 3 – Wally Flager
November 5 – Mike Goliat
November 18 – Les Layton
November 19 – Roy Campanella
November 20 – Neill Sheridan
November 21 – Janet Anderson
November 26 – Jodie Beeler
November 26 – Mickey McGowan

December
December 1 – Bob Savage
December 5 – Dave Ferriss
December 9 – Chuck Kress
December 12 – Bill Howerton
December 14 – Bobby Adams
December 23 – Marge Callaghan
December 27 – Lucille Colacito
December 28 – Nelson Burbrink

Deaths

January–February
January 1 – Dead Ball Era
January 1 – George Winkleman
January 24 – Laurie Reis
February 11 – John Cullen
February 13 – Barney McLaughlin
February 14 – Jumbo Davis, 59, third baseman for seven seasons from 1884 to 1891.

March–April
March 10 – Pete Harrison, 36, English-born umpire who worked in the National League from 1916 to 1920.
March 21 – Tom Vickery
March 24 – Larry McLean
March 25 – Harry Arndt
March 30 – Frank Bancroft, 74, manager who won 1884 championship with Providence Grays, also managed six other teams; introduced baseball to Cuba in 1879, and was Reds executive for 30 years.
March 31 – John Fitzgerald, 50, pitcher for the 1891 Boston Reds.
April 3 – Pop Corkhill
April 3- George Bechtel, Pitcher for the Louisville Grays one of the inaugural franchises in the National League.
April 9 – Kid Butler
April 21 – Tom O'Brien, 60, utility who played in each position except shortstop, while batting a .231 average for five different teams between 1882 and 1890.
April 27 – Hal Mauck

May–June
May 10 – Pete Harrison, 36, National League umpire from 1916 to 1920
May 14 – John Farrell
May 26 – Gil Hatfield
June 5 – George Rettger
June 10 – Julie Freeman
June 15 – Robert Foster
June 24 – Charlie Hall
June 27 – Hugh Nicol, 63, Scottish right fielder who set 19th-century record for steals with 138 for 1887 Cincinnati team.

July–August
July 1 – Amos Booth
July 16 – Arthur Irwin, 63, Canadian shortstop for six teams who managed Boston to 1891 American Association pennant; later a scout and minor league manager.
July 21 – Tom McLaughlin
July 22 – Jack Robinson
July 24 – Bill Dugan
August 24 – Emil Gross, 63, catcher for five seasons from 1879 to 1884.
August 26 – Henry Oberbeck

September–October
September 3 – Jim Clinton, 71, outfielder for 10 seasons; 1872–1876, 1882–1886.
October 2 – Ed Carfrey
October 20 – Jack Hardy
October 24 – Jimmy Barrett
October 27 – Bill Kuehne, 63, German third baseman for the Columbus Buckeyes, Pittsburgh Alleghenys & Burghers, Columbus Solons, Louisville Colonels, St. Louis Browns, and Cincinnati Reds during the 19th century.

November–December
November 4 – Levi Meyerle, 76, infielder who won National Association batting titles in 1871 and 1874, later playing in the first major league game.
December 9 – Charlie Morton, 67, player, manager, and later a minor league president.
December 15 – Joe Weber
December 22 – Socks Seybold

References